Óscar Esquivias (born 28 June 1972 in Burgos, Castile and León, Spain) is a Spanish short-story writer, poet and novelist.

Biography 
He studied at the University of Burgos. He was director of the literature magazine Calamar, revista de creación (1999-2002). His first novel, El suelo bendito (Award Ateneo Joven of Seville) was published in 2000. The trilogy of novels composed of Inquietud en el Paraíso (2005), La ciudad del Gran Rey (2006) and Viene la noche (2007) shows his personal vision of Dante's Divine Comedy.

He published a collection of short stories, Pampanitos verdes, many of which contained homosexual characters and themes.

He is currently a member of the Academy of Fine Arts and History 'Institución Fernán González'.

In December 2022, together with the photographer Asís G. Ayerbe, he founded the magazine Mirlo, dedicated to photography and literature.

Works

Novels 
Étienne el Traidor (2008)
Viene la noche (2007)
Mi hermano Étienne (2007)
La ciudad del Gran Rey (2006)
Inquietud en el Paraíso (2005) 
Huye de mí, rubio (2002) 
Jerjes conquista el mar (2009) [first edition: Madrid, Visor, 2001]
El suelo bendito (2000)

Novelettes 
El arpa eólica (in Steampunk : antología retrofuturista, 2011)

Collected short stories 
Pampanitos verdes (2010) 
La marca de Creta (2008)
 Andarás perdido por el mundo (2016).
 El chico de las flores (algunos cuentos favoritos). Valladolid: Junta de Castilla y León-Fundación Jorge Guillén, 2019 [Personal anthology of short stories].
Alguien se despierta a medianoche (el libro de los profetas). Pictures: Miguel Navia. Madrid: Reino de Cordelia, 2022.

Prizes and Rewards 
2011: Award “La tormenta en un vaso” to the best book written in Spanish in 2010.
2008: Award “Setenil” of short stories.
2006: Award of the Critic of Castile and León.
2003: Mention in the “White Ravens” catalogue of the Internationale Jugend 	Bibliothek of Munich.
2000: Award “Arte Joven de novela” of the Community of Madrid.
2000: Award “Ateneo Joven” of Seville for Novel.
1990, 1995 y 1997 - Award Letras Jóvenes of Castile and León.

References

External links
  Official Page
 ''Gazapillo], Plough'', December 22, 2022 [Short Christmas story by Esquivias translated into English by Coretta Thompson

1972 births
Living people
People from Burgos
21st-century Spanish novelists
Spanish male novelists
21st-century Spanish poets
Spanish gay writers
Spanish alternate history writers
Spanish LGBT poets
Spanish LGBT novelists
Spanish male poets
Spanish male short story writers
Spanish short story writers